The Black–Allan Line is the straight south-eastern portion of the state border between the Australian states of New South Wales and Victoria. The line stretches north-west from Cape Howe on the Tasman Sea to Indi Springs, the headwaters of the Murray River. The Murray River then forms the remainder of the boundary between the two states until it reaches the South Australian border.

A suggestion made in 1867 by the then Bairnsdale Police Magistrate and Warden of Gold Fields Alfred William Howitt, who was concerned about the boundary of his jurisdiction, together with  District Surveyor J.G.W. Wilmot led to the survey of the eastern border between Victoria and New South Wales. 

The line is named for Alexander Black and Alexander Allan, the men who, between 1870 and 1872, surveyed the line that delineated the two colonies. The surveyors built regular stone cairns to demarcate their survey line, most of which survive to the present. The survey was also remarkably accurate for the time, only missing its precise end target by around 43cm.  Victorian Government astronomer Robert Ellery in was reportedly quoted as having described Black and Allan's work as "a piece of survey work which, for difficulties and for the requirement of skills, energy and endurance, as well for accuracy attained, I believe has never been surpassed"

The boundary of the Port Philip District of New South Wales was defined in the New South Wales Constitution Act, 1842 (UK) as "... the boundary of the district of Port Phillip on the north and north east shall be a straight line drawn from Cape How [sic] to the nearest source of the river Murray and thence the course of that river to the eastern boundary of the province of South Australia."  The Australian Constitutions Act, 1850 (UK) which established the colony of Victoria, uses the same definition.

Due to ongoing oversights between the states, however, the actual border was not officially (and legally) ratified until 2006.

References

Borders of New South Wales
Borders of Victoria (Australia)
Eponymous border lines